Lieutenant General David Byron Millar   is a Royal Canadian Air Force officer.  He previously served as the Chief of Military Personnel, where he was the senior officer responsible for all Canadian Armed Forces human resource policies.

Military career

Chief of Military Personnel

On February 20, 2013, Millar was appointed Chief of Military Personnel, taking over for Rear-Admiral Andrew Smith.

Personal
Millar and his wife, Sheila, live in their home in Ottawa, Ontario.

Notelist

References

External links

Major-General Dave Millar Assumes The Role of the Canadian Forces Chief of Military Personnel
News Release - Change of command for Joint Task Force North

Commanders of the Order of Military Merit (Canada)
Royal Canadian Air Force generals
Living people

Year of birth missing (living people)